Howard Chapnick (1922–1996) was an American editor, photo editor and a long-term leader of Black Star photo agency.

Biography
Chapnick was born in 1922 in Manhattan, New York. He graduated from New York University.

In 1940 Chapnick joined a recently founded photo agency, Black Star. During World War II he served in the United States Air Force. In 1946 he returned to Black Star. He formed a new department responsible for photo essays and books. He also worked to make and maintain a network of photographers around the world.
In 1964 Chapnick bought out the founders' shares and had been a president of the agency for 25 years.

He taught annual workshops at the University of Missouri School of Journalism. In 1994 he published a book called Truth Needs No Ally: Inside Photojournalism, summarising his many years of experience in the field of dealing with photojournalists.

Chapnick was a principal founder of the W. Eugene Smith competition and Memorial Fund, which awards grants for projects in humanist photography. After his death in 1996, the Fund established in his memory a grant to encourage and support leadership in fields ancillary to photojournalism.

Bibliography

References

 New York Times
 W. Eugene Smith Memorial Fund 

American editors
1922 births
1996 deaths
New York University alumni
People from Manhattan
United States Army Air Forces personnel of World War II
University of Missouri faculty